Manchu became a literary language after the creation of the Manchu script in 1599. Romance of the Three Kingdoms was translated by Dahai. Dahai translated Wanbao quanshu 萬寶全書.

Hong Taiji sponsored the translations of many Chinese language histories and classics in his newly declared Qing dynasty.

The majority of literary works in Manchu during the Qing dynasty consisted of officially sanctioned translations of Chinese Confucian classics and political works, and later translations of Chinese novels and texts on medicine, history, religion. There were few Manchu archetypal literary works.

The German sinologist Eric Hauer argued that the Manchu translations of Chinese classics and fiction were done by experts familiar with their original meaning and with how best to express it in Manchu. Because Manchu is easy to learn, these translations enable the student to use the Manchu versions of the classics to verify the meaning of the Chinese text, for instance, the Manchu translation of the Peiwen yunfu or the language of difficult Chinese novels, such as Jin Ping Mei. Most original material produced in Manchu were histories and documentary texts relating to military and foreign affairs on the northern frontiers which were handled by the Lifan Yuan, such as campaigns against the Dzungars.

Many Chinese medical texts were translated into Manchu under the Qianlong Emperor.

List of works

Works translated into Manchu

Classics and Histories
History of Liao 遼史  Wylie: Dailiyoo gurun i suduri, Möllendorff: Dailiyoo gurun i suduri.
History of Jin 金史  Wylie: Aisin gurun i suduri, Möllendorff: Aisin gurun i suduri.
History of Yuan 元史  Wylie: Yuwan gurun i suduri, Möllendorff: Yuwan gurun i suduri.
Spring and Autumn Annals 春秋  Wylie: Niengniyeri polori i pitghe, Möllendorff: Niyengniyeri bolori i bithe.
Four Books 四書 were translated in 1683 into Manchu as  Wylie: Han i araha inenggidari giyangnaha sze shu, Möllendorff: Han i araha Inenggidari giyangnaha sy šu, Translation: The Four books with the daily readings.
General History of China 通鑒綱目 or 通鑑綱目  Wylie: Tung giyan g'ang mu, Möllendorff: Tung giyan g'ang mu
The Art of War 孫子兵法  Wylie: Tchauhai paita pe gisurengge, Möllendorff: Coohai baita be gisurengge, Discourse on the art of War
Book of History 書經 was translated in 1760 as  Wylie: Han i araha upaliyampuha dasan i nomun, Möllendorff: Han i araha ubaliyambuha dasan i nomun. 御製繙譯書經
Book of Odes 詩經  Wylie: Han i araha upaliyampuha irgepun i nomun, Möllendorff: Han i araha ubaliyambuha irgebun i nomun.
Three Character Classic 三字經 was translated in 1796 as  Wylie: Manchu nikan ghergen i kamtsime sughe San tsz' ging pitghe, Möllendorff: Manju nikan hergen-i kamcime suhe San ze ging ni bithe, Translation: The three character classic, in Manchu and Chinese.

Military manuals
The first Manchu translations of Chinese works were the Liu-t'ao 六韜, Su-shu 素書, and San-lueh 三略- all Chinese military texts dedicated to the arts of war due to the Manchu interests in the topic, like Sun-Tzu's work The Art of War. The military related texts which were translated into Manchu from Chinese were translated by Dahai. Manchu translations of Chinese texts included the Ming penal code and military texts were performed by Dahai. These translations were requested of Dahai by Nurhaci. The military text Wu-tzu was translated into Manchu along with Sun-Tzu's work The Art of War. Chinese history, Chinese law, and Chinese military theory classical texts were translated into Manchu during the rule of Hong Taiji in Mukden with Manchus placing significance upon military and governance related Chinese texts. A Manchu translation was made of the military themed Chinese novel Romance of the Three Kingdoms. Chinese literature, military theory and legal texts were translated into Manchu by Dahai and Erdeni. The translations were ordered in 1629. The translation of the military texts San-lüeh, Su-shu, and the Ta Ming hui-tien (the Ming law) done by Dahai was ordered by Nurhaci. While it was mainly administrative and ethical guidance which made up most of San-lüeh and Su Shu, military science was indeed found in the Liu-t'ao and Chinese military manuals were eagerly translated by the Manchus and the Manchus were also attracted to the military content in Romance of the Three Kingdoms which is why it was translated. The Art of War was translated into Manchu as  Wylie: Tchauhai paita be gisurengge, Möllendorff: Coohai baita de gisurengge, Discourse on the art of War. Another later Manchu translation was made by Aisin Gioro Qiying.

Novels
Jin Ping Mei 金瓶梅  Wylie: Gin p'ing mei pitghe, Möllendorff: Gin ping mei bithe
The Carnal Prayer Mat 肉蒲團  Wylie: Jeo p'u tuwan i pitghe, Möllendorff: žeo pu tuwan i bithe
Romance of the Three Kingdoms 三國演義  Möllendorff: Ilan gurun-i bithe
Water Margin 水滸傳  Möllendorff: Sui hū bithe
Strange Stories from a Chinese Studio 聊齋誌異  Möllendorff: Sonjofi ubaliyambuha Liyoo jai jy i bithe

Plays
Romance of the Western Chamber 西廂記  Möllendorff: Manju nikan Si siang ki

Bannerman tales
A notable genre is 'Bannerman tales' (子弟書, zidishu), a sung verse narrative genre that developed within the Manchu bannerman community in Beijing in the 18th century, flourished in the 19th century and continued to be practiced even during the Republican era. There is at least one example of a Manchu-Mandarin bilingual text, but the Manchu version has been argued to be a translation from the Chinese one. Some other texts contain Manchu expressions within the Mandarin text, but most were only in Mandarin and were based on classic works of Chinese fiction. The performers were sometimes professionals, but often amateur bannermen and members of the Manchu elite.

Works issued in multilingual copies

Original Manchu literature

A rare example of Manchu folklore recorded in a Manchu-language manuscript is the Tale of the Nisan Shaman. Some Qing emperors such as the Kangxi and Qianlong emperors composed poems in Manchu, such as Ode to Mukden. An official by the name of Tulišen (1667-1741) wrote Record of Foreign Regions (Manchu: Lakcaha jecen be takūraha babe ejehe bithe), a journal describing his journey to the Volga to meet Ayuki, khan of the Torguts. The most extensive original work in Manchu is Record of the Words of One Hundred and Twenty Old Men (Manchu: Emu tanggū orin sakda-i gisun sarkiyan) by Sungyun (1754-1835), a collection of 120 essays on numerous different subjects.

References

Bibliography

Further reading

Toh, Hoong Teik, and 卓鴻澤. 2007. “Translation, Poetry and Lute Tunes Some Manchu Writings of Mingsioi and Jakdan”. Central Asiatic Journal 51 (2). Harrassowitz Verlag: 223–46. https://www.jstor.org/stable/41928458.

 
 
History of literature